This timeline of social nudity shows the varying degrees of acceptance given to the naked human body by diverse cultures throughout history. The events listed here demonstrate how various societies have shifted between strict and lax clothing standards, how nudity has played a part in social movements and protest, and how the nude human body is accepted in the public sphere.

Prehistory–1800 

 70,000 : Humans first wear clothing, a date suggested by evidence based on lice DNA which shows when the clothing louse first began to diverge genetically from the human head louse.
 720 BC: According to one legend, an athlete (Orsippos of Megara) who discards his loincloth wins his race at the Olympic Games. A variation of the legend asserts that the loincloth accidentally falls off a runner at the Olympics who trips on it, strikes his head, and dies. So, for reasons of either improved athletic performance or for safety, ancient Greek Olympic athletes compete naked.
 : In Sparta, both women and men occasionally appear nude in certain festivals and during exercise.  See Gymnopaedia.
 First century AD: Historian Diodorus Siculus records that the Celts commonly fight naked in battle. Nudity is mentioned several times in the New Testament, none of the examples give it a sexual connotation. For example, refusal to wear clothes could be a sign of insanity during this period. Nakedness was also used as a symbol of poverty or vulnerability. Some say that the term means semi-naked, arguing that it is unlikely that a Jew would go completely unclothed in public, although others argue that fishermen in the Sea of Galilee did actually work naked.
 100 AD–18th century: The Adamites are adherents of an early Christian sect that flourished in North Africa in the 2nd, 3rd and 4th centuries, with later revivals. They practiced "holy nudism", claiming that its members are re-establishing Adam and Eve's state of original innocence.
 201 AD: The first known liturgy of baptism is recorded by Saint Hippolytus of Rome, which insists on complete nudity for all participants, even down to the removal of jewellery and hair fastenings. Baptism is later segregated by sex, as suggested by a scene depicted on a 5th-century lead font, but still conducted on an unclothed participant. Christian groups, including the Adamites, Carpocratians, Aquarii, and Marcosians all practice social nudity at this time .
 393 AD: Students in ancient Greece exercise and receive instruction naked and athletes compete naked. This tradition ends in 393 AD when the Christian Emperor Theodosius I bans the Olympic Games because he considers them pagan.
632 AD: Quran teachings transmitted by Muhammad impose modest dress on men and women.
 : Leofric, Earl of Mercia imposes a heavy tax burden on the citizens of Coventry, England to support his grandiose public works. According to legend that is almost certainly untrue, his wife Godgyfu begs him to reduce the tax, and he tells her that she must ride naked through the city's market before he will do it. Godgyfu, remembered as Lady Godiva, accepts the challenge.
 1185–1333: In Kamakura-period Japan, religious bathing is provided to the public free of charge with no concept of gender segregation. After the collapse of free services, a for-pay system emerges which later evolves to become the modern day sentō.

1800–1899

1900–1974

1975–1989 

 
 
 
[source: N 19.3]
[source N 19.3]
 [source N 19.3]
 
 

 [source: Paul Rapoport Dec 2003]

 
[source N 12.2]

1990–1999 

 
  While this decision was only binding within Ontario, it is considered highly influential, and has been referenced and upheld several times, including in other jurisdictions.

 
 
 
 [source N 12.2]
 [source N 12.2]
 [source N 12.2]
 [source N 12.2]
 
 

 
 [source: TERA]
 [source: Terri Sue Webb]
 
 
 [source N 19.3]
 [source N 19.3]

2000–present

Repeating events
 Harvard Primal Scream at Harvard University, Cambridge, Massachusetts (once each semester)
 Rainbow Family of Living Light's annual Gathering of the Tribes for World Peace and Healing
 Solstice Cyclists, Seattle, June
 World Naked Bike Ride

See also

 Bohemianism
 Christian naturism
 Counterculture
 Culture jamming
 Direct action
 Flash mob
 History of nudity
 List of social nudity organizations
 Nude recreation
 Smart mob
 Social nudity in San Francisco
 Social nudity in Seattle

References

Further reading

External links
 Histoire du naturisme at Nateuropa.org -(In French). Google translation. Retrieved December 2006

Culture-related timelines
Civil disobedience
Culture jamming
Naturism